Abu Hafs may refer to:
Abu Hafs Umar al-Nasafi, a Muslim scholar of 11th/12th century
Mohammed Atef (Abu Hafs al-Masri), past military chief of al-Qaeda
Abu Hafs Umar al-Iqritishi, early ninth-century Andalusian pirate and founder of the Emirate of Crete
Abu Hafs ibn Amr (died ca. 928/931), last Arab emir of Malatya
Abu Hafs al-Urduni, Jordanian mujahid who fought in Chechnya
Mahfouz Ould al-Walid (Abu Hafs al-Mauritani), Islamic religious scholar associated with the Taliban and al-Qaeda. He opposed the September 11 attacks and has since distanced himself from al-Qaeda. 

Arabic masculine given names